The Port of Drobeta-Turnu Severin is one of the largest Romanian river ports, located in the city of Drobeta-Turnu Severin on the Danube River.

References

Drobeta-Turnu Severin
Ports and harbours of Romania
Buildings and structures in Mehedinți County